Agh Dizaj (also Romanized as Āgh Dīzaj; also known as Dīzaj) is a village in Chaldoran-e Shomali Rural District, in the Central District of Chaldoran County, West Azerbaijan Province, Iran. At the 2006 census, its population was 49, in 11 families.

References 

Populated places in Chaldoran County